Cerro Pelado is a fast-growing population centre, or neighborhood, in the Maldonado Department of southeastern Uruguay. It is one of the northern suburbs of Maldonado, along with Villa Delia and La Sonrisa. In the 2011 census, it was the 6th biggest populated centre of the department. According to some reports, there are about 12000 inhabitants in the area of influence of this neighborhood.

Population
In 2011 Cerro Pelado had a population of 8,177.
 
Source: Instituto Nacional de Estadística de Uruguay

References

External links
 INE map of Maldonado, Villa Delia, La Sonrisa, Cerro Pelado, Los Aromos and Pinares-Las Delicias

Populated places in the Maldonado Department